Onzo is a comune (municipality) in the Province of Savona in the Italian region Liguria, located about  southwest of Genoa and about  southwest of Savona.

Onzo borders the following municipalities: Aquila di Arroscia, Casanova Lerrone, Castelbianco, Nasino, Ortovero, Ranzo, and Vendone.

References

Cities and towns in Liguria